Dean Charles Laun (July 22, 1925 – October 21, 2011) was an American football coach.  He served as the head football coach at Buena Vista University in Storm Lake, Iowa from 1956 to 1959, compiling a record of 24–18–2.

Laun played college football for four years at Iowa State University where he was an All-Big Seven Conference selection at end in 1947.

Laun later coached high school football at several high schools in the state of California, including Downey High School, Grace M. Davis High School and Fred C. Beyer High School.

References

External links
 

1925 births
2011 deaths
American football ends
Buena Vista Beavers football coaches
Iowa State Cyclones football players
High school football coaches in California
High school football coaches in Illinois
High school football coaches in Iowa
People from Charles City, Iowa